The 2000–01 season was Paris Saint-Germain's 31st season in existence. PSG played their home league games at the Parc des Princes in Paris, registering an average attendance of 42,759 spectators per match. The club was presided by Laurent Perpère and the team was coached by Philippe Bergeroo and Luis Fernández. Éric Rabésandratana and Frédéric Déhu were the team captains.

Players

First-team squad

Competitions

Division 1

League table

Results summary

Results by round

Matches

Coupe de France

Coupe de la Ligue

UEFA Champions League

First group stage

Second group stage

References

External links

Official websites
PSG.FR - Site officiel du Paris Saint-Germain
Paris Saint-Germain - Ligue 1 
Paris Saint-Germain - UEFA.com

Paris Saint-Germain F.C. seasons
Paris Saint-Germain